The name Frente Nacional (Spanish for "National Front") may refer to:

 The Frente Nacional founded by Blas Piñar, which existed between 1983 and 1993: National Front (Spain, 1986)
 The unrelated Frente Nacional founded by José Fernando Cantalapiedra in 2006: National Front (Spain, 2006)
 National Front (Colombia)

See also
 National Front (disambiguation)